CHNB may refer to:

 CHNB-DT - a Global station in Saint John, New Brunswick
 CHNB-TV - a defunct CBC station in North Bay, Ontario
 Chondroitin B lyase, an enzyme